The Oshkosh M-ATV is a Mine-Resistant Ambush Protected (MRAP) vehicle developed by the Oshkosh Corporation for the MRAP All Terrain Vehicle (M-ATV) program. Intended to replace M1114 HMMWVs (Humvee), it is designed to provide the same levels of protection as the larger and heavier previous MRAPs, but with improved mobility.

History

Requirements and selection

In the summer of 2008, the U.S. Department of Defense (DoD) began to examine the possibility of developing and procuring a lighter-weight, all-terrain capable MRAP variant to address the poor roads and difficult terrain of Afghanistan. Source selection activity considered responses from more than 20 companies to a Request for Information (RFI)/market survey dated 21 August 2008 and in mid-November 2008 the U.S. government issued a pre-solicitation for an M-ATV. In early December 2008 the M-ATV formal Request for Proposals (RFP) was issued. The original M-ATV program requirement was for between 372 and 10,000 vehicles, with the most probable production quantity stated as 2,080.

In March 2009, it became known that two each of six different vehicle types (from five manufacturers) had been delivered to the U.S. Army for two months of evaluation, at the conclusion of which up to five ID/IQ (Indefinite Delivery/Indefinite Quantity) contracts would be awarded.  In addition to Oshkosh's proposal, BAE Systems submitted two proposals: a Joint Light Tactical Vehicle (JLTV) derived design and an FMTV-based Caiman derivative. Force Dynamics (a Force Protection/General Dynamics Land Systems (GDLS) joint venture) offered the Cheetah, GDLS-C (Canada) offered an RG-31 MRAP derivative, and Navistar offered an MXT-based solution.

After GDLS-C's RG-31 was eliminated from the competition in May 2009, it was announced that the five remaining bidders had been awarded ID/IQ contracts, and were each to deliver three production-ready test vehicles for the next stage of the competition. At the completion of testing, the U.S. DoD stated that it planned to select a single M-ATV producer but could, at its discretion, place production orders with multiple producers as it had done with the initial MRAP procurement. On 30 June 2009, the M-ATV contract award was announced with a single ID/IQ contract award to Oshkosh.  Brigadier General Michael Brogan, United States Marine Corps program officer for MRAP, stated that the Oshkosh M-ATV was chosen because it had the best survivability and Oshkosh had the best technical and manufacturing capabilities of all the competitors. The Oshkosh bid was also the second cheapest.

The initial M-ATV delivery order was valued at over $1 billion and included 2,244 M-ATVs. The overall M-ATV requirement had increased in early June from 2,080 to 5,244 M-ATVs, these split 2,598 (Army), 1,565 (Marines), 643 (U.S. Special Operations Command), 280 (Air Force), 65 (Navy), and 93 for testing.

Production and refurbishment

In July 2009, the first 46 M-ATVs were delivered, and in November the 1,000th M-ATV was handed over. Oshkosh reached its contractual obligation to produce 1,000 M-ATVs per month ahead of schedule in December 2009, and by using its existing manufacturing facilities in Oshkosh, WI (50%), and making use of its recession-hit JLG telescopic handler facility in McConnellsburg, PA (50%).  The first vehicles arrived in Afghanistan in October 2009 and were to be all delivered by March 2010.

In total 8,722 M-ATVs were delivered to the U.S. Army, U.S. Marine Corps, U.S. Air Force, and U.S. Special Operations Command (SOCOM). M-ATVs were delivered in two main variants. The base model is designated M1240 with the Objective Gunner Protection Kit [OGPK] manned turret; it is designated M1240A1 when fitted with the Underbody Improvement Kit (UIK). The second main variant is designated M1277 and is fitted with M153 CROWS remote-controlled weapon station (RCWS). Produced in smaller numbers, the SOCOM-specific variant is designated M1245; M1245A1 with UIK fitted.

As part of the overall divestiture of the MRAP fleet, the U.S. Government will keep about 80% (around 7,000) of the M-ATV fleet, 5,651 of these (inc. 250 for SOCOM) to be retained by the Army. Work is currently underway at Oshkosh's Wisconsin facility and the Red River Army Depot to reset the around 7,000 M-ATVs retained to a common build standard. Oshkosh was awarded an initial 500-vehicle M-ATV Reset contract in August 2014. Three additional contract options for 100 vehicles each were awarded in December 2014. Total contract value is in excess of US$77 million. Deliveries were scheduled to continue through September 2015.

Reset work centers on returning vehicles to Low Rate Initial Production (LRIP) 22 standard: essentially the build standard for the final M-ATV production batch. LRIP 22 includes upgrades such as the UIK and enhanced Automatic Fire Extinguishing System (AFES). Reset work also adds Engineering Change Proposals (ECPs) that include acoustic signature reduction (muffler), Modular Ammunition Restraint System (MARS) ammunition storage, and some Government Furnished Equipment (GFE) relocation.

On 28 May 2015, Oshkosh announced the U.S. Army had awarded it a contract modification for the reset of 360 additional M-ATVs. The modification includes options for the reset of up to 1,440 additional M-ATVs. Deliveries for this latest modification started October 2015. Oshkosh is on contract to reset a combined 1,160 M-ATVs with a total value of over $115 million.

In January 2017, the US Marine Corps disclosed that they would upgrade and refurbish around 80 M-ATVs over a five-month period, the work scheduled to take three to four weeks for each M-ATV and cost around $385,000 per vehicle, with both Marine and Air Force M-ATVs involved. The main difference between the two services M-ATVs is the armament; Air Force M-ATVs are fitted with a CROWS (Common Remotely Operated Weapon Station), while Marine M-ATVs are fitted with a manual OGPK (Objective Gunner Protection Kit) turret.

Developments
At the Association for Unmanned Vehicle Systems International (AUVSI) 2013 convention, Oshkosh announced the integration of the TerraMax system onto the M-ATV to allow the type to be converted into an unmanned ground vehicle. The goal is to use the M-ATV as an unmanned platform for route clearance and counter improvised explosive device (IED) missions by engineers.

Oshkosh Defense unveiled the M-ATV Extended Wheel Base Medical (EXM) variant at the International Defense Exhibition and Conference (IDEX) 2015 (22–26 Feb.) in Abu Dhabi, United Arab Emirates. This variant of the M-ATV has enough interior capacity to simultaneously transport two litter-bound patients, two ambulatory patients, a medic, commander and driver. The M-ATV EXM's customizable internal configuration also enables equipment to be accessed quickly by a centrally positioned medic.

In February 2015, Oshkosh Defense and Alliant Techsystems conducted a firing demonstration of the M230LF 30 mm chain gun on an M-ATV to demonstrate the viability and effectiveness of a medium caliber weapon system for light tactical vehicles. The addition of the  M230LF stabilized on the RWS provides mobile precise lethality, usually reserved for heavier combat vehicles, with exceptional off-road mobility and MRAP levels of protection.

The M-ATV proved to be more survivable than the Humvee and was lighter than other MRAP versions, but to further enhance survivability and mobility for troops, the U.S. military undertook the Joint Light Tactical Vehicle (JLTV) program to obtain a vehicle combining light weight, mobility, and protection. In August 2015, Oshkosh was awarded the contract for their Light Combat Tactical All-Terrain Vehicle (L-ATV), which took design lessons from fielding the M-ATV and incorporated them into a truck at two-thirds the weight and with faster off-road speeds.

By 2018, the Marine Corps was deploying a Counter-Unmanned Aerial System (C-UAS) that can be mounted onto an M-ATV. The Ground-Based Air Defense (GBAD) Counter-UAS system consists of the RPS-42 S-band radar, the Modi electronic warfare system, visual sensors and Raytheon Coyote anti-drone UAV to detect, track and destroy hostile drones.

Design

The M-ATV combines a Plasan designed armored hull developed for the Northrop Grumman/Oshkosh JLTV Technology Development (TD) phase proposal with some elements of the Medium Tactical Vehicle Replacement (MTVR) chassis and Oshkosh's TAK-4 suspension system. TAK-4 suspension is coil sprung and fully independent, and offers 16 inches of wheel travel.

For survivability, and in addition to the V-shaped hull which is optimized for IED protection, other aids include the ability to take a 7.62 mm round to the engine oil/coolant/hydraulic system and continue to drive for at least one kilometer. The engine compartment is also protected with the Stat-X engine fire suppression system. A central tire inflation system (CTIS) and run-flat inserts allow the M-ATV to travel at least 30 miles at 30 mph even if two tires lose pressure. The M-ATV also features a traction control system and anti-lock brakes. 

Armament is roof-mounted and can be either manually or remotely operated. Manual options include a M240 machine gun, a Mk 19 grenade launcher, an M2 Browning machine gun, a MILAN anti-tank guided missile, or a BGM-71 TOW anti-tank guided missile launcher. Remote option is usually the CROWS (Common Remotely Operated Weapon Station), however as previously mentioned, Oshkosh has also fitted for demonstration purposes the R400S-Mk2, a 3-axis stabilized remote weapon station when has the M230LF chain autocannon mounted on.

Other M-ATV features include a HVAC system and power outlets for charging portable electronic devices. The M-ATV is also unique among MRAP-type designs in that it uses suicide-type rear doors.

Exports
The United Arab Emirates Army initially ordered 55 M-ATVs through an FMS sale in 2011. The UAE ordered another 750 M-ATVs direct from Oshkosh in July 2012. These are to provide greater off-road mobility and crew protection for regional security and peace-keeping operations; users include the elite Presidential Guard. Deliveries were completed in August 2013.  In September 2014, the UAE requested another 44 M-ATVs from U.S. surplus stocks.

In September 2013, the Saudi Arabian Army began negotiations for an order for an undisclosed number of M-ATVs.  Saudi Arabia received an estimated 450 M-ATVs including some extended wheelbase variants.

On 7 April 2014, the U.S. government donated 162 M-ATVs to the Croatian Army for use in small-scale combat operations in urban and restricted environments. Fifteen M-ATVs are going to the Croatian Special Forces Command (SFCOM), five will be with the Support Command (SCOM), two with the Military Police Regiment, and 78 entered service with the Croatian Army in 2015, with a further 62 to follow in 2016 for the 1st Battalion of the Motorized Guards Brigade in Gospic.

In January 2015, it was reported that the U.S. was to donate 308 Mine Resistant Ambush Protected (MRAP) vehicles to Uzbekistan under the Excess Defense Articles program. Requested totals include 159 M-ATVs with UIK, plus 50 Maxxpro Plus, 20 MaxxPro recovery, 50 BAE RG-33L CAT II and 70 Cougar CAT 1 (W/ISS (65); W/O ISS 5) vehicles.

In February 2015, it was disclosed that the U.S. was providing 20 M-ATVs to African Union (AU) peacekeepers in Somalia. These M-ATVs will replace older 1980s-vintage Casspir vehicles.

On 25 February 2015, Polish special forces received 45 M-ATVs. The handover ceremony took place in Cracow, Poland and the US Ambassador in Poland, Stephen D. Mull, participated in the event. Delivery of the MRAP vehicles was carried out within the framework of the Excess Defense Articles program, the standard way that the U.S. military gives surplus equipment to allies.

In June 2016, photographs released by the Iraqi Ministry of Defence showed M-ATVs with Iraqi Special Operations Forces (ISOF) (also known as the Counter-Terrorism Service (CTS)) units advancing northwards for the operation to retake the Islamic State-held city of Mosul.

On March 17, 2023, a video appeared on the Telegram site: https://t.me/c/1712562931/16925  

showing a convoy of M-ATV’s crossing Ukraine.

Variants

Oshkosh formally announced the addition of designated variants to the M-ATV family in April 2014. The range has evolved since then, the current five variants announced in May 2016.

The five current variants are:
 M-ATV Special Forces – 5-seat with protected cargo area. Curb Weight: 31,467 lb (14,273 kg); payload: 5,500 lb (2,495 kg).
 M-ATV Assault – modular seating for up to 11. Curb Weight: 35,450 lb (16,080 kg); payload: 4,400 lb (1,996 kg). Extended wheelbase.
 M-ATV Engineer – modular seating for 5 to 11. Curb Weight: 35,225 lb (15,978 kg); Payload: 4,400 lb (1,996 kg). Mine roller ready. Extended wheelbase.
 M-ATV Command – 5-seat. Curb Weight: 35,128 lb (15,934 kg); payload: 4,400 lb (1,996 kg). Extended wheelbase.
 M-ATV Utility – 5-seat. Curb weight w/fuel: 29,344 lb (13,310 kg); payload: 7,000 lb (3,181 kg). Flatbed platform with ISO-lock corner fixings. Extended wheelbase.

6×6 technology demonstrator

In October 2015, Oshkosh unveiled an M-ATV 6×6-wheeled technology demonstrator. The vehicle was designed with greater interior volume to transport three crew and 8–12 troops and to have greater payload capacity while maintaining MRAP-level protection and off-road mobility, combining the TAK-4 independent suspension and the M-ATV 6×6's all-wheel steer for maneuverability across any terrain.

Operators

 
 : 147 with the Army and 15 with the Special Forces 
 
 
 : 45 
 : 22 vehicles operated in Afghanistan as of 2018.
 : 160 
 : 750 
 : 5,651 in the Army and 704 with the USMC 
 
  – Evidence of use by Yemeni army in current conflict.
 : 96 JLTVs, US donation

References

Bibliography
 Jane's Military Vehicles and Logistics, 2009–2010 by Shaun C Connors & Christopher F Foss (Executive Overview) .
 Jane's Military Vehicles and Logistics, 2010–2011 by Shaun C Connors & Christopher F Foss (Executive Overview) .
 G3 Defence Vol 2 Issue 4 August 2010 pp. 46–49 (B'Gosh by Shaun Connors) .

External links

 
 M-ATV on Oshkosh Defense page
 
 
 
 
 
 
 
 

Wheeled armoured fighting vehicles
Post–Cold War armored fighting vehicles of the United States
Oshkosh vehicles
Military light utility vehicles
Military vehicles introduced in the 2000s